War emergency power (WEP) is a throttle setting that was present on some American World War II military aircraft engines. For use in emergency situations, it produced more than 100% of the engine's normal rated power for a limited amount of time, often about 
five minutes. Similar systems used by non-US forces are now often referred to as WEP as well, although they may not have been at the time, as with the German Luftwaffe's Notleistung and Soviet VVS' forsazh systems.

WEP in World War II aircraft

Maximum normal power would be limited by a mechanical stop, for instance a wire across the throttle lever slot, but a more forceful push would break the wire, allowing extra power. Several methods were used to boost engine power by manufacturers, including water injection and methanol-water injection. Some earlier engines simply allowed the throttle to open wider than normal, allowing more air to flow through the intake. All WEP methods result in greater-than-usual stresses on the engine, and correspond to a reduced engine lifetime. For some airplanes, such as the P-51D, use of WEP required that the engine be inspected for damage before returning to the air. 5 hours' total use of WEP on the P-51D required a complete tear-down inspection of the engine.

British and Commonwealth aircraft could increase power by increasing the supercharger boost pressure. This modification was common by the summer of 1940, with the widespread availability of 100 octane fuel. Pilots had to log the use of emergency boost and were advised not to use it for more than 5 minutes continuously.

The German MW 50 methanol-water injection system required additional piping, as well as a storage tank, increasing the aircraft's overall weight. Like other boost techniques, MW 50 was restricted by capacity and engine temperatures and could only be used for a limited time. The GM 1 nitrous oxide injection system, also used by the Luftwaffe, provided extreme power benefits of 25 to 30 percent at high altitude by adding oxidizer gases but required cooling on the ground and, like the MW 50 boost system, added significant weight. Kurt Tank reportedly once did this, using both boost systems simultaneously when he was flying a Junkers Jumo 213E-powered Ta 152H prototype fitted with both MW 50 and GM-1, to escape a flight of P-51D Mustangs in April 1945.

Modern times

MiG-21 

Perhaps the most dramatic WEP feature was found in the MiG-21bis fighter jet. This late variant of the standard Soviet light fighter plane was built as a stopgap measure to counter the newer and more powerful American F-16 and F/A-18 fighters until the next-generation MiG-29 could be introduced to service.

The MiG-21bis received the upgraded Tumansky R-25 engine, which retained the standard  normal and forsazh power settings of earlier R-13 powerplants, but added a second fuel pump to supply the new super-afterburning system with jet fuel. Use of this "diamond regime" provided a massive  of thrust for no more than 3 minutes in actual wartime use.

In air combat practice with the MiG-21bis, use of WEP thrust was limited to one minute, to reduce impact on the engine's 800 flight hours lifetime, since every second of super-afterburner use counted as several minutes of regular power run due to extreme thermal stress.

F-15C 

The Vmax switch on the F-15 fighter jet allows the engines to burn 22 degrees hotter and about 2 percent more revolutions per minute. It is safety-wired shut. During combat, pulling the Vmax switch would provide the pilot with a little more thrust. However, the engines would then need to be serviced and rebuilt.

WEP in surface vehicles 

Some modern military surface vehicles also employ WEP features. The US Marine Corps Expeditionary Fighting Vehicle (cancelled in 2011) sported a 12-cylinder  diesel engine developed by the German company MTU. When the EFV is swimming the powerplant can be boosted to  via the use of open circuit seawater-cooling. Such extreme war power setting allows the MTU engine to drive four massive water-jet exhausts which propel the surface-effect riding EFV vehicle at sea speeds reaching .

Although the EFV prototypes demonstrated revolutionary performance on water and land, the reliability of their extremely boosted powerplants
never met stringent military standards and the vehicle failed to enter Marine Corps service.

Boost systems
 Water injection
 MW50 (German, methanol/water mixture)
 GM 1 (German, nitrous oxide injection)
 Forsazh (Russian)
 Propane injection

See also
Afterburner
Flank speed

References

Aircraft propulsion components